Kalpanthe Sihinayak (කල්පාන්තයේ සිහිනයක්) is a 2014 Sri Lankan fantasy thriller film directed by Channa Perera and produced by Perly Wijesinghe, Sunethra Balasuriya, Harsha Gamaethige and Asela Amarasiri. It stars Channa Perera and debutant Indian actress Chaithra Chandranth in lead roles along with Sanath Gunathilake and Hemasiri Liyanage. Music co-composed by Rohana Weerasinghe and Dinesh Subasinghe. It is the 1115th Sri Lankan film in the Sinhala cinema.

The film was initially titled Miringu Yaathra. Its plot is based on a King Ravana's missing Ancestry Book which was hidden for more than 5,000 years. The film was shot around Rattota forest areas, Dambulla, and Kaludiya Pokuna Forest.

Plot
It is essentially a love story between an architect and a beautiful village girl. The architect, Kalpa (Channa), travels to a hill country village for work and it is there that meets Menaka (Chaithra). Kalpana faces many challenges with a local group of thugs secretly investigating King Ravan's Ancestry Book. Menaka is a part of Ravan's Ancestry. Her father was murdered by some hidden enemies because of a conflict over a secret document regarding the Ravan Ancestry. Kalpa gets more intrigued about this matter and turns to the monk at the village temple for advice.

The journey to the truth is full of challenges and along the way the duo fall in love.

Cast
 Channa Perera as Kalpa Wickramasinghe
 Chaithra Chandranth as Menaka aka Menu
 Sanath Gunathilake as Mapa
 Iranganie Serasinghe as Menu's elder mother
 Hemasiri Liyanage as Village monk
 Nihal Fernando as CID officer
 Sandun Wijesiri as Jayatunga
 Himali Sayurangi as Padmi
 D.B. Gangodathenna 
 Gunadasa Madurasinghe as Salesman
 Saman Almeida as Hilton
 Prasanna Fonseka
 Kapila Sigera
 Teddy Vidyalankara

Music
The music is a collaboration between Dr. Rohana Weerasinghe and Dinesh Subasinghe. Weerasinghe provided the background score and two songs for the film, whilst Subasinghe prepared the love theme music, the title song and the theatrical trailer music. The vocals were provided by Uresha Raviharee, Sumudu Nimantha Munasinghe, Udaya Wickramasinghe and Ranjan Saliya.

Soundtrack

References

External links

Profile at National Film Corporation of Sri Lanka
‘කල්පාන්තේ සිහිනයක්’ අතර චන්න පෙරේරාගේ අලුත්ම චිත්‍රපටය

2014 films
2010s Sinhala-language films